The 1990 Cork Senior Hurling Championship was the 102nd staging of the Cork Senior Hurling Championship since its establishment by the Cork County Board in 1887. The draw for the opening fixtures took place on 17 December 1989. The championship began on 29 April 1990 and ended on 21 October 1990.

Glen Rovers entered the championship as the defending champions, however, they were beaten by Carbery in the quarter-finals.

The final replay was played on 21 October 1990 at Páirc Uí Chaoimh in Cork between Na Piarsaigh and St. Finbarr's, in what was their first ever meeting in a final. Na Piarsaigh won the match by 2-07 to 1-08 to claim their first ever championship title.

Brian Cunningham was the championship's top scorer with 2-28.

Results

First round

Second round

Quarter-finals

Semi-finals

Finals

Championship statistics

Top scorers

Overall

In a single game

Miscellaneous

 Na Piarsaigh became the first city side other than "the big three" to win the title since Redmonds in 1917. It is also their first ever title.

References

Cork Senior Hurling Championship
Cork Senior Hurling Championship